Liu Wei (born 15 August 1984) was part of the Chinese team that won gold in Wheelchair curling at the 2018 Winter Paralympics. He had poliomyelitis in youth.

References

External links 

1984 births
Living people
Chinese male curlers
Chinese wheelchair curlers
Paralympic wheelchair curlers of China
Paralympic medalists in wheelchair curling
Paralympic gold medalists for China
Wheelchair curlers at the 2014 Winter Paralympics
Wheelchair curlers at the 2018 Winter Paralympics
Medalists at the 2018 Winter Paralympics
People with polio
21st-century Chinese people